Bechari Qudsia (Urdu: بیچاری قدسیہ , lit. 'Poor Qudsia') is a 2021 Pakistani family soap drama serial that premiered on 19 July 2021 on Geo Entertainment. The drama serial is a presentation of Electro Entertainment produced by Arif Lakhani, Written by Irfan Ahmed Shams and directed by Irfan Aslam. It airs daily at 7:00 p.m. on Geo Entertainment and is digitally available to stream on YouTube.

Plot 
Qudsia's parents challenge poverty and manage to get their daughter enrolled in a prestigious university despite working odd jobs. Her inferiority complex makes it difficult for her to adjust in her surrounding, which prompts her to fake a privileged lifestyle. Unfortunately, she attracts the richest students on campus, which angers Anaya as she cannot bear sharing her friends with anyone. Anaya gets possessive to the extent of hurting Qudsia's reputation when her own crush, Ibrahim, gets fond of the new girl.

Before Anaya could take her friendship with Ibrahim to the next level, he professes his love for Qudsia instead. Qudsia's days in the university get more complicated each day as Anaya is adamant to expose Qudsia's mediocre background to everyone who took Qudsia at her word. Ibrahim rushes to Qudsia's help every time Anaya puts Qudsia in a vulnerable situation. After all else fails, Anaya gets hold of some lifestyle videos Qudsia had made secretly in Ibrahim's house where she was working temporarily to compensate for her mother's sick leaves.

When her videos go viral on the internet, Qudsia faces many tragedies, including her father's death who couldn't bear the humiliation. Her videos also attract plenty of wandering eyes as well as haters—Ibrahim's sister being one of them. Qudsia's relatives also walk in to suffocate her with character assassination after another secret admirer from the internet starts sending her gifts and flowers. Hailing from a lower-middle-class background, Qudsia begins to face the hardship her father had protected her from in his lifetime.

Cast 

 Fatima Effendi as Qudsia (protagonist)  
 Bilal Qureshi as Ibrahim (protagonist) 
 Moomal Khalid as Anaya (antagonist) 
 Shabbir Jan as Rasheed; Qudsia's father (Dead) 
 Kinza Malik as Hajra; Qudsia's mother (Dead)  
 Daniyal Afzal Khan as Khalid; Qudsia's cousin 
 Ali Rizvi as Ilyas; Qudsia's brother
 Mizna Waqas as Kishwar; Ilyas's wife
 Ayesha Gul as Rabia; Ibrahim's mother (Dead)
 Farhan Ally Agha as Iqbal; Ibrahim's father
 Laiba Khan as Anoushay; Ibrahim's younger sister
 Kamran Jeelani as Anaya's father
 Fahima Awan as Naila 
 Aliha Chaudry as Rida
 Yasir Alam as Ali; Anaya's cousin 
 Beena Chaudhary as Nargis: Khalid's mother
 Asfand
 Qasim Khan

References

External links 

 Official website

2021 Pakistani television series debuts
Urdu-language television shows
Pakistani drama television series